Cyperus benadirensis is a species of sedge that is native to an area of eastern Africa.

The species was first formally described by the botanist Emilio Chiovenda in 1932.

See also 
 List of Cyperus species

References 

benadirensis
Taxa named by Emilio Chiovenda
Plants described in 1932
Flora of Somalia
Flora of Kenya